Protoprioniodus is an extinct genus of conodonts.

Use in stratigraphy 
The Whiterock Stage refers mainly to the early Middle Ordovician in North America. It is often used in the older literature in a global sense. The Whiterock Stage is given a range from 471.8 (ca. 472) to 462 m.y.a., spanning close to 10 million years. Officially its start is defined by the potentially lowest occurrence of the conodonts Protoprioniodus aranda or Baltoniodus triangularis.

References

External links 
 
 

Prioniodontida genera
Ordovician conodonts